The Ministry of Finance is a  government ministry office of the Republic of Tunisia, responsible for finance and tax affairs in Tunisia. The current minister is Sihem Boughdiri since 2 August 2021.

List of ministers

1956–1958: Hedi Amara Nouira
1958: Bahi Ladgham
1958–1960: Ahmed Mestiri
1960: Bahi Ladgham
1960–1961: Hédi Khefacha
1961–1969: Ahmed Ben Salah
1969–1971: Abderrazak Rassaa
1971–1977: Mohamed Fitouri
1977–1980: Abdelaziz Mathari
1980–1983: Mansour Moalla
1983–1986: Salah Ben M'barka
1986: Rachid Sfar
1986–1987: Ismaïl Khelil
1987–1989: Nouri Zorgati
1989–1992: Mohamed Ghannouchi
1992–1997: Nouri Zorgati
1997–1999: Mohamed Jeri
1999–2004: Taoufik Baccar
2004: Mounir Jaidane
2004–2010: Mohamed Rachid Kechiche
2010–2011: Mohamed Ridha Chalghoum
2011: Jalloul Ayed
2011–2012: Houcine Dimassi
2012–2013: Slim Besbes (interim)
2013–2014: Elyes Fakhfakh
2014–2015: Hakim Ben Hammouda
2015–2016: Slim Chaker
2016–2017: Lamia Zribi
2017: Fadhel Abdelkefi
2017–2020: Ridha Chalghoum
2020: Nizar Yaïche
2020-2021: Ali kooli
2021- : Sihem Boughdiri

References

Finance
Tunisia
Ministries established in 1882